Catherine Story (born 1968) is an artist living and working in London. Story studied at Royal Academy Schools.

In October 2009, Story had her first solo exhibition Pylon in London at the Carl Freedman Gallery, followed by a second solo show Angeles in November, 2011 of new paintings and sculpture.

In 2013, Story exhibited at Tate Britain in 'Painting Now'. In 2018, Story had a solo show 'Shadow' at PEER, London.

References

External links
Frieze magazine review of Catherine Story 'Angeles' exhibition, March 2012 issue
Catherine Story 'Artist of the week', Guardian.co.uk, December 2011
Time Out London review of Catherine Story's solo show 'Angeles', December 2011
10 Magazine feature on work of Catherine Story, October 2011
Catherine Story 'Pylon' exhibition, ArtReview magazine, January 2010

Living people
1968 births
English women painters
British conceptual artists
Women conceptual artists
English contemporary artists
21st-century British women artists
20th-century English women
20th-century English people
21st-century English women
21st-century English people